The Iris Awards, created by the newspaper El País, are given for achievements in Uruguayan radio, television and social networks.

History
The first edition of the awards was in 1983, although they were not given again until 1995. Since then they have been delivered annually. There are more than 30 categories, among which the Golden Iris is most prominent. The awards are given by the newspaper El País and disseminated by its entertainment supplement Sábado Show.

The trophy's shape is based on a human figure holding an eye with a square iris. Depending on the profession of the person who won it, a different silhouette appears under the figure's feet – a film reel, musical note, etc.

Since 2010, the ceremony has been broadcast live on television throughout Uruguay.

Currently some categories can be voted on by the public.

Television broadcast

Golden Iris Award

Other awards

2016
The following categories were awarded at the 2016 Iris Awards, for 2015 programs:

2017
The following categories were awarded at the 2017 Iris Awards, for 2016 programs:

See also
 Iris Award (disambiguation)
 Latin American television awards

References

External links
 

1983 establishments in Uruguay
Arts awards in Uruguay
Radio awards
Uruguayan television awards